The Son of a Gunn Show was a New Zealand after-school, children's television show, hosted by Jason Gunn, that aired on TVNZ from 1992, to the final episode in 1995. It was produced in the Christchurch TVNZ Building and finished when the production of children's programmes was moved to Wellington.

The Son of a Gunn Show saw Jason often accompanied by his sidekick Thingee, a grey puppet with bulbous eyes.

See also
 After School
 What Now
 Jase TV

References

External links

1992 New Zealand television series debuts
1995 New Zealand television series endings
1990s New Zealand television series
New Zealand children's television series
TVNZ original programming
Television shows funded by NZ on Air
New Zealand television shows featuring puppetry